Mountain Home may refer to:

 Mountain Home (album), by Owen Temple
 Mountain Home (magazine), a Pennsylvania magazine

Place names 
 Mountain Home, Arkansas
 Mountain Home Village, California
 Mountain Home (Santa Clara County, California)
 Mountain Home Reservoir, Colorado
 Mountain Home, Idaho
 Mountain Home Air Force Base
 Mountain Home Post Office
 Mountain Home, North Carolina
 Mountain Home, Tennessee, home of the U.S. Veterans Affairs Medical Center and National Cemetery
 Mountain Home, Texas
 Mountain Home, Utah
 Mountain Home (Front Royal, Virginia), listed on the NRHP in Warren County, Virginia
 Mountain Home, West Virginia
 Mountain Home (White Sulphur Springs, West Virginia), a house listed on the National Register of Historic Places

See also
Mountain House (disambiguation)